iD Dunedin Fashion Week is an annual festival of fashion held in the New Zealand city of Dunedin in the South Island (New Zealand) in March or April. The festival has been held regularly since 1999.

Description
iD Dunedin is a not-for-profit charitable organisation.

iD Fashion Week is supported by city, community and commercial partners, run by a management team and governed by iD Dunedin Fashion Inc – a registered charitable organisation. Funds raised by the event are carried on to help fund the next year’s event.

See also

 List of fashion awards

References

Recurring events established in 2000
New Zealand fashion
Festivals in Dunedin
Fashion awards
Otago Polytechnic
Autumn events in New Zealand